Ursel is a Flemish surname:

Place 
Ursel, town in Flanders, part of Knesselare.

Name 
 Noble house d'Ursel, Duke of Ursel, see too: D'Ursel Castle.
 Lancelot II of Ursel
 Charles-Joseph, 4th Duke d'Ursel
 Marie Joseph Charles, 6th Duke d'Ursel
 Henri d'Ursel
 Philippe d'Ursel
 Léo d'Ursel
 Bob Ursel
Ursel Bangert
 Ursel Lorenzen
 Jim Ursel

Other 
 Ursel Air Base
 D'Ursel Point

 
Dutch-language surnames